The discography of the Libertines, a London-based indie rock band, consists of three studio albums, four extended plays (EPs), one compilation album, six singles and six music videos. Formed in 1997, the Libertines consisted of Pete Doherty (vocals/rhythm guitar), Carl Barât (vocals/lead guitar), John Hassall (bass) and Gary Powell (drums).

The Libertines released their first single "What a Waster" in June 2002 through Rough Trade Records. The single broke into the UK top 40, and earned the band acclaim from the British music press. The Libertines followed up with their debut full-length album Up the Bracket in October 2002. Although Up the Bracket only peaked at number thirty-five in the UK, it was critically acclaimed, and rated as one of the year's best by many publications. Two singles were released to support the album; "Up the Bracket", which reached number twenty-nine in the UK, and "Time for Heroes", which peaked at the twentieth spot.

In August 2003, the Libertines released their fourth single, "Don't Look Back into the Sun". It was their highest-charting effort so far, reaching number eleven. The band's self-titled second album The Libertines was released a year later in August 2004. The album debuted at the top of the British charts, helped by lead single "Can't Stand Me Now", which hit number two. The Libertines, which was certified platinum in the UK, saw the band chart in the United States for the first time, peaking at number 111 on the Billboard 200. In 2007, Rough Trade issued a greatest hits compilation, Time for Heroes – The Best of The Libertines, which reached number twenty-three in the UK.

Albums

Studio albums

Compilation albums

Live albums

Extended plays

Singles

Notes

Music videos

Miscellaneous

References

External links
Discography at Spirit of Albion: A Libertines fan-site
Discography at Libertines-de fan-site

 
Discographies of British artists
Rock music group discographies